Dr. Cedric Garland is an epidemiologist known for his research in the field of vitamin D deficiency. He has written upwards of 150 articles and books on the subject. Garland partnered with his late brother Frank C. Garland in some of this research. Their most widely cited paper is Garland CF, Garland FC, Gorham ED, et al. "The Role of Vitamin D in Cancer Prevention." American Journal of Public Health 2006;96(2):252-261. doi:10.2105/AJPH.2004.045260, cited 829 times according to Google Scholar.

References

External links
 University of San Diego....Staff member Dr. Cedric Garland
 NCBI Contributor....Dr. Cedric Garland

American epidemiologists
Year of birth missing (living people)
Living people
Place of birth missing (living people)